Saint Proculus of Bologna or Saint Proculus the Soldier (died c. 304 AD) is an Italian saint. He is said to have been a Roman officer who was martyred at Bologna under Diocletian.

Traditional Narrative
Saint Proculus is the military patron of Bologna. In the time of the Diocletian, one Marinus was sent to Bologna to enforce the emperor's edict. Incensed by Marinus' cruelty, Proculus went to Marinus' house and killed him with an axe. The Bolognese have held Proculus in veneration from very ancient times. His remains are preserved in the church of San Procolo in Bologna.

References

3rd-century births
304 deaths
Military personnel from Bologna
Italian saints
4th-century Christian martyrs
4th-century Romans